Debra Anne March (born November 25, 1953) is an American politician serving as the mayor of Henderson, Nevada. Before being elected mayor, March served on the Henderson City Council for eight years. In January 2018, a ruling found March in violation of ethics when she failed to disclose her relationship with the Henderson Community Foundation while the city council was voting on legislation relating to the foundation.

Due to a court ruling regarding the elections for the city council and mayor by the Nevada Supreme Court and changes to the law regarding all elections here statewide by the Nevada Legislature and Governor Steve Sisolak, March is not eligible to run for re-election in 2022 due to term limits. 

She has chosen to run for Lieutenant Governor of Nevada in 2022, after former Lieutenant Governor Kate Marshall resigned to join the Biden administration in 2021.

See also
2017 Henderson mayoral election
2022 Nevada lieutenant governor election

References

1953 births
Living people
Mayors of Henderson, Nevada
Nevada city council members
Nevada Democrats
University of Nevada, Las Vegas alumni